Sandeman Fort, also known as Zhob Fort is a fortress and a military garrison situated in Zhob District, Baluchistan. It was built in 1890 and is named after British administrator, Robert Groves Sandeman, who pacified the region.

History
It was built by the British in 1890.

Prior to stationing of British troops in the area, the name of the city was Appozai, which was renamed as Fort Sandeman after British administrator Robert Sandeman who pacified the region.

In 1976, it was renamed as Zhob by Zulfiqar Ali Bhutto.

See also
List of forts in Pakistan

References 

Forts in Balochistan
Zhob District
1890 establishments in British India
Hill stations in Pakistan